Evangeline Parsons Yazzie ( 1952 – May 22, 2022) was a Navajo educator and author of the first textbook adopted by the U.S. public education system to teach the Navajo language.

Life 
Yazzie received a Master of Arts degree in Bilingual Multicultural Education and a Doctorate in Education from Northern Arizona University (NAU) where she taught Navajo language courses for 24 years until 2014. In 2007, Yazzie co-authored a textbook for teaching the Navajo language titled Diné Bizaad Bínáhooʼaah: Rediscovering the Navajo Language along with Margaret Speas, a professor of linguistics at the University of Massachusetts. In 2008, New Mexico adopted the textbook making itself the first U.S. state to officially use any text for teaching the Navajo language in its public school system.

Following her retirement in 2014, Yazzie authored several novels about a fictional family's experience of the Long Walk of the Navajo. Yazzie died on May 22, 2022, at age 69.

References

Native American women writers
21st-century Native American women
Native American women academics
21st-century Native Americans
Navajo people
Northern Arizona University alumni
20th-century American educators
20th-century American women educators
21st-century American educators
21st-century American women educators
21st-century American novelists
21st-century American non-fiction writers
21st-century American women writers
American textbook writers
Women textbook writers
Native American academics
Northern Arizona University faculty
1950s births
2022 deaths